Funny Times (FT) is an American humor newspaper founded in 1985, and still published as of 2022, by the wife and husband team of Susan Wolpert and Raymond Lesser. Wolpert and Lesser were inspired by The Comic News of Santa Cruz, California, "a monthly journal of progressive editorial cartoons" founded in 1984 by Thom Zajac.  FT political content is often subversive and has a progressive/liberal perspective.

In 1997, Sandee Beyerle coincidentally came across the office of Funny Times in order to escape inclement weather.  From there, she worked her way up to managing editor, and when Ray Lesser retired as editor, Beyerle replaced him as his successor. After Beyerle's retirement in 2022, Mia Beach was hired as the new editor.

Format and subscriptions 
The monthly Funny Times publication is printed in the format of a daily newspaper, on newsprint paper, with each of the 24 pages measuring 11 X 17 inches.  The only ads it runs are for its own FT-related merchandise. FT subscriptions have been $26 per year since 2013, which increased to $28 in late 2018.

Content 
Each Funny Times issue is organized into sections such as "Relationships", "Dogs", "Politics", "Current Events", and others, with the section categories varying somewhat from issue to issue.  Each issue includes cartoons, columns and essays that derive humor from pop culture, current events, politics and day-to-day living.  A full page in each issue is devoted to the syndicated column originally developed by Chuck Shepherd, News of the Weird, which features dozens of bizarre true stories from around the world. Publisher Ray Lesser frequently contributes his own humorous essays.  As of the early 2000s, each issue contained choice selections of such offbeat comic strips as This Modern World by Tom Tomorrow, Bizarro by Dan Piraro, Zippy the Pinhead by Bill Griffith, Too Much Coffee Man by Shannon Wheeler, Tom the Dancing Bug by Ruben Bolling, The K Chronicles by Keith Knight, and Slowpoke by Jen Sorensen.

Other contributing writers and cartoonists have included, circa 2000:

Dave Barry
Lynda Barry
Harry Bliss
Andy Borowitz
Matt Bors
Bill Bryson
Bruce Cameron
Sean Chiki
Andrei Codrescu
Derf Backderf
Will Durst
Bob Eckstein
Tim Eagen
Mitra Farmand
Lauren Glattly
Martha Gradisher
Matt Groening
Garrison Keillor
Keith Knight
Paul Krassner
Peter Kuper
Molly Ivins
Carol Lay
Peter McKay
Raymond Lesser 
Chris Monroe
Carlos Montage
Michael Moore
Janet Periat
K. A. Polzin
Bev Potter
Hilary B. Price
Phil Proctor
Ted Rall
Rita Rudner
Lenore Skenazy
Terry Stawar
Tom Toro
P.C. Vey
John Walsh
Kim Warp
Roz Warren
Jon Winokur
Matt Wuerker
Alison Bechdel

As of 2021, works by a few of the above cartoonists and writers still appeared regularly in the Funny Times.

Other publications
In 2002, Funny Times published the book Funny Times: The Best of The Best of American Humor: The Funniest Cartoons, Columns, and Essays from the Funny Times Newspaper (Three Rivers Press).  As of 2018, the book is no longer offered by FT but is still available elsewhere, secondhand.

From January 2007 to September 2013, the Funny Times website featured the "Cartoon Playground", in which anyone with Internet access could create and instantly post their own comic strips using artwork drawn by Matt Wuerker. Some of the more frequent contributors to the Playground Cartoon section included individuals going by such names as: CIAgent, Claustrophobic, cta, Danger Dan, Demosfoni, Ducky, Earthmuffin, Elephant Man, Ellie May, Eric Per1in, Fracturedfish, Hal, Just Bean, Konrad Schwoerke, Lo Bottomy, Mr Smartypants, Queen Bean, Rick Dickulous, Sophie, Yankees with Hope, and Zack. These people communicated with each other using cartoons, turning the 'Cartoon Playground' into somewhat of a social networking site. Some of the very best of reader-created cartoons were, for a while, featured in the monthly print edition.

As of 2020, for several years the Funny Times website has featured the "Cartoon of the Week", which is also emailed weekly to subscribers.

References

External links

1985 establishments in Ohio
Cleveland Heights, Ohio
American comedy websites
Newspapers published in Cleveland
Publications established in 1985